More B.S. is the second album by singer-songwriter Bree Sharp. It was released by Sharp's own label, Ahimsa Records, on August 13, 2002.

Track listing
All lyrics by Sharp (except "The Boys of Summer").

Japan bonus tracks
David Duchovny (live acoustic version) = 4:25
Show Me (alternate version) = 4:11
I Will Wait (demo version) = 3:42

Personnel
Bree Sharp – vocals
Don DiLego – guitars, bass (except on "The Ballad of Grim and Lily"), percussion, loops, harmonies, organ, Moog synthesizer, Farfisa, Mellotron, Wurlitzer
Jeremy Adelman – trumpet on "Sleep Forever"
Simon Austin – acoustic guitar on "Morning in a Bar"
Paul Garisto – drums (except on "Galaxy Song" and "The Ballad of Grim and Lily")
Amanda Kapousouz – violins on "The Last of Me" and "The Boys of Summer"
Erik Olsen – bass on "The Ballad of Grim and Lily"
Gregg Williams – drums on "Galaxy Song" and "The Ballad of Grim and Lily"

Bree Sharp albums
2002 albums